LaBranche & Co. Inc. was a market maker and specialist firm on the NYSE, one of the oldest in the business at the time of its acquisition.  It also operated in options, futures, and ETFs through various subsidiaries.  Its stock symbol on the NYSE was LAB.

LaBranche & Co. said it signed a definitive agreement to sell its NYSE Designated Market Maker business to Barclays Capital for $25 million. LaBranche will still retain their NYSE Euronext NYX.N shares.

On June 29, 2011, Cowen Group completed its acquisition of LaBranche, ending the firm's independent existence.

Michael LaBranche is the Chairman, President and CEO of LaBranche & Co. Company's revenue is $345 million in 2000.

References

External links
LaBranche & Co Inc.

Companies formerly listed on the New York Stock Exchange
Financial services companies of the United States
2011 mergers and acquisitions